The Brunei Prison Department (BPD), or the Brunei Prison Service, is the prisons agency of Brunei. It is a part of the Ministry of Home Affairs, with its offices along Jalan Jerudong.

Prisons
 Penjara Jerudong
 Penjara Maraburong (opened 1 August 2001)
 Penjara Wanita (Women's Prison)

References

External links
 Brunei Prison Service 
 Brunei Prison Service
Prison Department
Prison and correctional agencies

Government agencies of Brunei